The Westminster Griffins are the athletic teams that represent Westminster College, located in Salt Lake City, Utah, in intercollegiate sports as a member of the NCAA Division II ranks, primarily competing in the Rocky Mountain Athletic Conference (RMAC) for most of its sports since the 2015–16 academic year (which they were a member on a previous stint from 1967–68 to 1978–79 before suspending its athletics program); while its men's and women's alpine skiing teams compete in the Rocky Mountain Intercollegiate Ski Association (RMISA) affiliated with the NCAA. The Griffins previously competed in the Frontier Conference of the National Association of Intercollegiate Athletics (NAIA) from 1998–99 to 2014–15.

Varsity teams
Westminster competes in 15 intercollegiate varsity sports: Men's sports include alpine ski, basketball, cross country, golf, lacrosse, soccer and track & field; while women's sports include alpine ski, basketball, cross country, golf, lacrosse, soccer, track & field and volleyball. Current non-NCAA sports include cheerleading, cycling, dance, men's soccer (club) and snowboard.

Athletic facilities
The following are athletic facilities for the Westminster Griffins:

 Behnken Field House — men's and women's basketball, volleyball
 Dumke Field — men's and women's soccer, men's and women's lacrosse teams

References

 
Griffins